The History of Warfare is a 3660-minute documentary series about the most famous wars and battles in world history focusing primarily on the military annals of Great Britain.

The series was created during the 1990s, when Cromwell Productions Ltd became a production company specialising in historical and arts documentaries taking the example of other shows from Cromwell such as Line of Fire and Battlefield.

Presentation

The series dedicates numerous episodes to determine conflicts such as the English Civil Wars, the Napoleonic Wars, and the American Civil War. In addition to having segments such as Discovery To Revolution about the discovery and colonisation of the American continent by the Spanish, Dutch, French and English and Under Siege about the most famous battles of siege warfare.

The series has the participation as narrators of many British actors such as Robert Powell, Iain Cuthbertson and Brian Blessed. Bob Carruthers served as screenwriter and producer. The series included interviews with many military historians such as David G. Chandler then professor at the Sandhurst Military Academy.

Episodes

Trivia

 Brian Blessed is narrator for the episode about the War of the Roses, which is also a coincidence because he is also the narrator for the video game War of the Roses.
 History of Warfare is another link to the long chain in the partnership by Brian Blessed and Bob Carruthers, having worked together on several other projects such as Dinosaurs: Myths and Realities and Chasing the Deer.
 Iain Cuthbertson is Scottish and narrator for all the Scottish episodes.
 Screenwrither and Producer Bob Carruthers is also Scottish.
 Bob Carruthers was also producer and screenwriter for the Line of Fire and Battlefield TV series.
 The series has been translated into over four languages such as Spanish, French, German and Russian.

References

1992 British television series debuts
2001 British television series endings
1990s British documentary television series
2000s British documentary television series
Works about warfare
English-language television shows